The Pushcart derby is a popular sporting event held every August in Jamaica where homemade carts that are used for street vending, to transport items or as a racing cart take part in races like the American soap box races. The carts have been clocked at up to 60 miles per hour on a downhill homestretch.

The venue of the event is the Kaiser's Sports Club for the finals of the annual Push Cart Derby. 

The pushcart derby in Jamaica is credited as the inspiration for the Jamaica national bobsled team.

The pushcart derby is also featured in the 1993 movie Cool Runnings.

See also 
 Culture of Jamaica

References

Jamaican culture
Competitions in Jamaica
Racing
Summer events in Jamaica